Third-seeded Kea Bouman defeated Irene Bowder Peacock 6–2, 6–4 in the final to win the women's singles tennis title at the 1927 French Championships. She is the first and to date only Dutch women to win a Grand Slam singles title.

Seeds
The seeded players are listed below. Kornelia Bouman is the champion; others show the round in which they were eliminated.

 Marguerite Billout (quarterfinals)
 Lilly De Alvarez (quarterfinals)
 Kea Bouman (champion)
 Irene Peacock (finalist)
 Cilly Aussem (quarterfinals)
 Suzanne Devé (third round)
 Phoebe Holcroft Watson (third round)
 Eileen Bennett (semifinals)

Draw

Key
 Q = Qualifier
 WC = Wild card
 LL = Lucky loser
 r = Retired

Finals

Earlier rounds

Section 1

Section 2

Section 3

Section 4

References

External links
 

1927 in women's tennis
1927
1927 in French women's sport
1927 in French tennis